Flavors, an early object-oriented extension to Lisp developed by Howard Cannon at the MIT Artificial Intelligence Laboratory for the Lisp machine and its programming language Lisp Machine Lisp, was the first programming language to include mixins. Symbolics used it for its Lisp machines, and eventually developed it into New Flavors; both the original and new Flavors were message passing OO models. It was hugely influential in the development of the Common Lisp Object System (CLOS).

Implementations of Flavors are also available for Common Lisp.

New Flavors replaced message sending with calling generic functions.

Flavors offers  and  daemons with the default method combination (called ).

Flavors and CLOS features comparison 
Flavors offers a few features not found in CLOS:
 Wrappers
 Automatic lexical access to slots using variables within methods.
 Internal flavor functions, macros and substs.
 Automatically generated constructors.
  function for sending messages.

CLOS offers the following features not found in Flavors:
 Multimethods
 Methods specialized on individual objects (via ).
 Methods specialized on Common Lisp types (symbol, integer, ...).
 Methods specialized on def-struct types.
 Class slots.

Terminology

References

Further reading
 
 "Flavors, Technical Report", MIT Artificial Intelligence Laboratory, Cambridge (Mass.), 1980
 Daniel Weinreb and David A. Moon, "Flavors: Message Passing in the Lisp Machine", A.I. Memo No. 602, November 1980, MIT AI Lab

Lisp programming language family
Object-oriented programming languages